'Tisaura'/Babhanpura is a village in Varanasi sadar tehsil, Varanasi district in Uttar Pradesh state in India, located  from the cantonment railway station in Varanasi and  from its airport. It is located 20.42 km from its District Main City Varanasi on the highway that connects it to Nepal, and 261 km from its State Main City Lucknow.

References 

Villages in Varanasi district